Psychrobacter arcticus is a Gram-negative, nonmotile  species of bacteria  first isolated from Siberian permafrost. Its type strain is 273-4T (=DSM 17307T =VKM B-2377T).

Hypoacylated lipopolysaccharide (LPS) from P. arcticus induces weak TLR4-mediated inflammatory response in macrophages and such LPS bioactivity may potentially result in the failure of local and systemic bacterial clearance in patients.

References

Further reading
Whitman, William B., et al., eds. Bergey's manual® of systematic bacteriology. Vol. 5. Springer, 2012.
Dworkin, Martin, and Stanley Falkow, eds. The Prokaryotes: Vol. 6: Proteobacteria: Gamma Subclass. Vol. 6. Springer, 2006.

External links
LPSN

Type strain of Psychrobacter arcticus at BacDive -  the Bacterial Diversity Metadatabase

Moraxellaceae
Bacteria described in 2007